Adam Edelman  (born March 14, 1991) is an American-born Israeli sliding sports athlete. He is a four-time Israeli National Champion in the skeleton event who competed for Israel at the 2018 Winter Olympics in Pyeongchang, South Korea. Edelman is the first Orthodox Jew to compete in the Winter Olympics, and the first Orthodox Jewish man to compete in either Olympic iteration.  Edelman is training for the 2026 Beijing Olympic Games and program general manager for the Israel bobsled team.

Biography
Adam Edelman was born in Boston, Massachusetts, and grew up in Brookline, Massachusetts. He was raised in a Zionist, Modern Orthodox home by parents Cheryl (a lawyer) and Elazer Edelman (a biomedical engineer, physician, professor, and inventor). He is the middle of three boys. His elder brother is comedian Alex Edelman who helped found Off the Wall Comedy in Jerusalem.

Edelman graduated from the Massachusetts Institute of Technology in 2014 with a degree in mechanical engineering.  He was a member of the MIT Men's hockey team and a staff editorial columnist for the MIT newspaper, The Tech.  MIT President Rafael Reif's 2018 commencement address used Edelman's Olympic journey as a basis of his message to the graduating class.

Edelman immigrated to Israel in 2016 and trained at Wingate Institute. He is a dual American-Israeli citizen. He is an MBA candidate at the Yale School of Management.

Edelman is nicknamed the "Hebrew Hammer," a reference to the title character in the 2003 American comedy film The Hebrew Hammer.

Edelman has said he is a supporter of anti-bullying and mental health initiatives, and that his motivation for continuing in sport is largely a desire "to use my Olympic journey as a platform to promote further Jewish and Israeli involvement in sport." He was named a 2021 European Forbes 30 Under 30 in the Sports and Games category for his efforts of using his platform to campaign against bullying and increase LGBTQ participation in sport.

Sports career

Hockey 
Edelman's first sport was ice hockey, which he began playing at age three, as a goaltender. He continued to play hockey through high school for the Brookline Warriors hockey team and at MIT, where he was the program's first ever sabbath observant player. Edelman helped the MIT Engineers win two divisional championships in the Northeast Collegiate Hockey Association (NECHA) Division II league.

Bodybuilding 
Edelman competed as an NGA accredited bodybuilder, placing in a top-3 medal finish at the 2014 NGA Annapolis Bodybuilding Championships.

Olympic sliding sports

Skeleton 
Edelman tried skeleton for the first time at the Olympic facilities in Lake Placid, NY in March 2014 where he was given an assessment that he would never be competitive. The Israeli team was similarly told that Edelman would "get down the track but that’ll be the most of it." Nevertheless, Edelman set out a goal of qualifying for the 2022 Olympics.

In his first race at the 2014 North American Cup, Edelman finished 18.64 seconds behind the race winner, and after hearing another athlete indicate that given his poor performance Edelman would quit within 2 years, decided to focus on making the 2018 Olympics, rather than 2022. In the 2018 Olympic qualification season, Edelman had cut this deficit to 1.19 seconds, placing ninth.

In 2016, he decided to quit the sport and return to work, but changed his mind at the last minute and decided to train full-time, resigning from his job as a product manager at Oracle.

Lacking funds, Edelman could not afford a coach and was self-taught.  He reinforced his learning of the sport by watching nearly 12 hours of YouTube video daily.

Edelman entered the final days of 2018 Olympic qualification outside of qualification position, needing two medal performances in the Lake Placid North American Cup races to jump up the ranking table. He secured Israel's first sliding sport Olympic berth by earning a fifth place medal in both races.

Edelman competed for Israel at the 2018 Winter Olympics in PyeongChang, South Korea, finishing in 28th place.

Edelman competed in two World Championships for Israel, and retired from skeleton as Israel's most decorated slider, winning four Israeli national titles and two medals in IBSF-sanctioned international competition, the most of any Israeli sliding sport athlete.

Bobsled 
Post-skeleton, Edelman dedicated his efforts to qualifying an Israeli bobsled team for the 2022 Beijing Olympics.  Neither the two-man nor four-man team qualified. He is now focused on qualifying a team for the 2026 Olympics.

In February 2021 Edelman placed second at a locally organized international bobsleigh competition, considered Israel's first bobsleigh podium in international competition.  At the 2021 Korea Cup, Edelman's team secured Israel's highest IBSF sanctioned bobsleigh result, placing fourth out of six entrants.

Edelman is a recipient of Jew in the City's Orthodox Jewish All Star award.  Some of his equipment is on display at the Jewish Sports Hall of Fame in Commack, NY.

References

External links
 
 

1991 births
American bodybuilders
American emigrants to Israel
Israeli male skeleton racers
Israeli people of American-Jewish descent
Jewish American sportspeople
Jewish Israeli sportspeople
Living people
MIT Engineers men's ice hockey players
Olympic skeleton racers of Israel
People from Beit Shemesh
Sportspeople from Brookline, Massachusetts
Skeleton racers at the 2018 Winter Olympics
Sportspeople from Boston
21st-century American Jews